Dr. Abhimanyu Singh Arha is an environmental historian, writer and academic from India. Abhimanyu Singh serves as the deputy director of the University of Rajasthan's Centre for Museology and Conservation. He also serves as an advisor to the Government of Rajasthan on Tourism and Heritage Protection. Arha also writes in Rajasthani, his mother tongue, in both verse and prose.

Early life and education 
Abhimanyu Singh Arha was born in Rajasthan, India.

In 2005, Arha graduated from St. Stephen's College, Delhi.

He went on to achieve his doctorate (PhD) from Jawaharlal Nehru University, Delhi where his field of study was Medieval Indian history and ecological history. He received his PhD in 2011.

His research interests include the relationship between environment, trade, and state-building, as well as the history of diplomacy and autobiographies.

Career 
Arha has taught at St. Stephen's College, Delhi, Maharaja Ganga Singh University, Bikaner and University of Rajasthan, Jaipur. His research papers have been published widely.

In January 2011, Arha started as a Lecturer at St. Stephan's College, Delhi.

Thereafter, for the duration of June 2011 to December 2013, Arha worked as assistant professor at Maharaja Ganga Singh University as a specialist in medieval Indian history.

Arha serves as assistant professor of history in the Department of History & Indian Culture, University of Rajasthan. He specializes in medieval history. He was appointed to the position in December 2013.

Deputy director of Centre for Museology and Conservation(UOR) 
Arha has been named the new deputy director of the University of Rajasthan's Centre for Museology and Conservation. Arha has been holding this position since November 2020.

Arha also serves as an advisor to the Government of Rajasthan on tourism and heritage protection.

Events

Hakim Khan Suri vandalism incident 
In February 2016, when Hakim Khan Suri's tomb at Rajsamand was vandalised by miscreants, Professor Arha clarified Suri's role in the Battle of Haldighati saying "Suri's great sense to read the Mughals had made him one of the military commanders". He argued that Pratap entrusted Suri in this important battle even though he had joined Pratap's side late.

Different historical accounts say that Suri joined the army along with his 800 to 2000 army personals. "He fought as a foremost part of the Pratap's army," said Arha.

He argued that Pratap entrusted Suri in a battle against a Muslim ruler Akbar whose army was commanded by a Rajput king Man Singh demolishes the popular historical interpretation which misleads that war was between Hindus and Muslim.

Maharana Mewar Public School career counselling session 
In March 2016, a Career Counselling Session at Maharana Mewar Public School for the students of senior classes of X-XII. Dr. Abhimanyu Singh informed the students about the tremendous opportunities and career prospects available in the field of Humanities.

3rd World Living Heritage Festival, 2016 at Udaipur 
Dr Abhimanyu Singh participated as a speaker in the World Living Heritage Festival at Udaipur in 2016. He partook in the discussion on oral traditions & folk lore and their importance in reconstruction of history.

National Conference at University of Rajasthan, 2017 
A National Conference was organized by the Ministry of Culture and Delhi Library at the Rajasthan University campus. The theme of the conference was ‘Maharana Pratap and his Era’, in which prominent historians, Dr Abhimanyu Singh Arha, Professor GSL Deora, Professor K.S. Gupta, Professor B.L. Bhadani, Professor V.K. Vashist, Dr Ms. Ranawat, Dr Hukum Singh Bhati took part.

JLF (Jaipur Lit. Festival), 2018 
Abhimanyu Singh was invited as the featured Rajasthani writer on Rajasthali: Dharti ri Koonkh at Jaipur Literature Festival in February 2018. He was joined in conversation by Bulaki Sharma, Reena Menaria, and Arvind Singh Ashiya, who moderated the session. Arha emphasized on the history of the Rajasthani language, which was one of the richest in 16th century India, traced from a metered form to the addition of current and contemporary literary styles, reflecting the rich living tradition of Rajasthani literature in its many moods and manifestations.

Military Literature Festival–2018 in Chandigarh 
In December 2018, Prof. Arha participated as a guest speaker at Military Literature Festival-2018 in Chandigarh.

He went into detail on the contribution of Vir Ras to the Indian Medieval Period. He made special mention of well-known poets like Chand Bardai, author of Prithvi Raj Raso and, as well as reciting several couplets by mediaeval authors composed in Vir Ras.

International Conference on Indian Business and Economic History – 2019 
In August 2019, Dr Abhimanyu Singh participated in International Conference on Indian Business & Economic History-2019 organized by IIM-Ahemdabad History-Conference-2019. He spoke on the topic: "Entrepreneurial History of Indian Diaspora in Central Asia in the Early Modern Period".

Tribute to Prof. Madalsa Ujjwal 
In November 2019, a program in memory of Late Prof. Madalsa Ujjwal, Political Science at JNVU University, was held at University of Rajasthan.

Dr Abhimanyu Singh Arha, co-director of the centre welcomed all the guests and highlighted the personality and work of Professor Prof Madalsa Ujjwal. He said that Ujjwal made an incomparable contribution in the field of higher education for four decades and did commendable work in the direction of empowerment of women of western Rajasthan as a strong cultural worker. Professor Anand Mathur, a colleague of Professor Madalsa Ujjwal, said that Prof. Madalsa was the epitome of bright scholarship, decency, and gentleness.

Hoofprint of Empire: An Environmental History of Fodder in Mughal India 
In January 2021, Yashaswini Chandra, the author of ‘The Tale of the Horse: A History of India on Horseback’ recommended the journal article by Abhimanyu Singh Arha, ‘Hoofprint of Empire: An Environmental History of Fodder in Mughal India' for those interested in the role of the Indian horses in medieval India.

This work of Abhimanyu Singh has been cited in multiple books including 'Climate of Conquest War, Environment, and Empire in Mughal North India By Pratyay Nath · 2019'.

Azadi Ka Amrut Mahotsav, JKK(Jawahar Kala Kendra) Jaipur 
In July 2021, Arha was invited as a speaker on a webinar programme organized by JKK(Jawahar Kala Kendra) Jaipur and the Department of Art & Culture under the Government of Rajasthan. The webinar was held on the birth anniversary of Chandra Shekhar Azad titled 'Swatantrata Yagya ka Agnipunj'.

Dr Abhimanyu Singh Adha said that in 1925 the Kakori train from Shahjahanpur to Lucknow was robbed by some of the selected revolutionary leaders of that time, including Chandrashekhar Azad. The train was carrying money from the British treasury, which was robbed to collect money to buy weapons for the revolution. Azad managed to escape from the police. He clarified that these revolutionary leaders received a lot of support, not because they were young, passionate men who used to kill people for their own pleasure, but because they were well-educated, intellectual and well-mannered men who were on a well-planned mission to achieve their stated goal.

Azadi Ka Amrut Mahotsav, Panjab University Regional Centre, Ludhiana 
In October 2021, Arha was invited to speak on the webinar by Panjab University Regional Centre(PURC) in Ludhiana over Azadi Ka Amrut Mahotsav celebrations, marking 75 years of Indian independence. He was the keynote speaker on this occasion. 'The Role of Women in the Gandhian Movement' was the topic of a webinar. More than 100 people attended and took part in the conversation, including academics and students.

Dr Abhimanyu Singh said: “Gandhiji was the first and the most powerful national leader who engaged himself in the Indian National Movement directly with the issue of women empowerment.”

Abhimanyu Singh spoke to the audience about the importance of digging deeper into Gandhiji's writings and developing a knowledge of his multi-layered discourses. Arti Puri, Director PURC-Ludhiana, supervised a question-and-answer session during which students interacted with Abhimanyu Singh.

Published works and research papers 
 Arha, Abhimanyu Singh (2013). "Globalization, Cultural Heritage and Travel Industry: Scope of Developing New Tourist Attractions". Globalization and Voices from Indian Practitioners.
 Arha, Abhimanyu Singh (2016). "The Outsider's Eye: The Travelogues of Pietro Della Valle and Mountstuart Elphinstone". Sufi Poetics, Buddhism and Travelogues.
 Arha, Abhimanyu Singh (2016-08). "Hoofprint of Empire: An Environmental History of Fodder in Mughal India (1650–1850)". Studies in History. 32 (2): 186–208. doi:10.1177/0257643016645721. ISSN 0257-6430.
 Arha, Abhimanyu Singh (2014). "Rival Parties in Eighteenth Century Marwar Court: Competing Claims to Ecology and Resources". Proceedings of the Indian History Congress. 75: 371–376. ISSN 2249-1937. JSTOR 44158405.
 Arha, Abhimanyu Singh (2014). "Business Management Practices in Medieval India: Lighting the Path Ahead". International Journal of Research and Scientific Innovation (IJRSI):Volume I/Issue VII.
 Arha, Abhimanyu Singh (2013). "State, Trade and Ecology: A Study of Marwar AD. 1707–1843". Jawaharlal Nehru University: Centre for Historical Studies.
 Arha, Abhimanyu Singh (2007). "Foreign Travelogue in the Seventeenth Century A.D: Traces of Eco-Tourism".
 Arha, Abhimanyu Singh (2012). "The Persona of Sawai Singh of Pokhran". Rajasthan History Congress Proceedings Volume XXVII.

References 

Charan
People from Rajasthan
Year of birth missing (living people)
Living people
Indian writers